Fall Brook Gorge is located in the Town of Geneseo in Livingston County, New York, outside the Village of Geneseo. It is an excellent example of Upper and Middle Devonian rock formations.

It was designated a National Natural Landmark in January 1970.  It is on private land.

See also
List of National Natural Landmarks in New York

References

National Natural Landmarks in New York (state)
Landforms of Livingston County, New York
Tourist attractions in Livingston County, New York
Canyons and gorges of New York (state)